Prístavný most (literally Harbour Bridge, until 1993 known as Most hrdinov Dukly or Dukla Heroes' Bridge) is a double-floor motorway-railroad truss bridge over the Danube in Bratislava, Slovakia, near the Port of Bratislava. It lies on the D1 motorway. It is a 599 m long (1080 m with access roads) bridge (over the Danube part), and was built between 1977 and 1985. There are also pathways for pedestrians and cyclists on the bridge.

Today, the bridge suffers from heavy traffic because it is a route for many commuters from Petržalka, and due to the lack of an outer circle around the city it is also a route for transfer traffic. The situation improved slightly after the opening of the nearby Apollo Bridge in 2005. Traffic jams are common around the bridge and they occur regularly at the end of each week and after traffic accidents. The bridge was built to handle around 60,000 vehicles/day, but current traffic consists of around 120,000 vehicles/day and it is rising.

See also 
 History of Bratislava

References

External links 
 
 Prístavny most - web camera online

Bridges in Bratislava
Bridges completed in 1985
Bridges over the Danube
20th-century architecture in Slovakia
Railway bridges in Slovakia
Transport in Bratislava